Husky  is a studio album by Skerik's Syncopated Taint Septet released 2006. It was recorded at the Sound Factory in Los Angeles, California March 2004. Much of the recording is first takes. Skerik talks about recording the album:
"For me, Husky is that rare combination of everything lining up perfectly at the right time. You're lucky if you get one of these in a lifetime. The band had been on the road touring, so we knew the music inside out. We had a day off in Los Angeles, so we went into The Sound Factory, which is a one-of-a-kind studio out there and cut the entire record that day."
The album received favorable reviews.

Musicians 
 Craig Flory –  baritone saxophone and clarinet
 Hans Teuber – alto saxophone, flute
 Steve Moore – trombone, Wurlitzer electric piano
 Joe Doria – Hammond organ
 Dave Carter – trumpet
 Skerik – tenor and baritone saxophone
 John Wicks – drums
 Isalee Teuber – vocal on "Daddy Won't Taint Bye-Bye"

Track listing 
 "The Third Rail" (Steve Moore)
 "Go to Hell, Mr Bush" (Hans Teuber)
 "Syncopate the Taint" (Steve Moore)
 "Fry His Ass" (Joe Doria)
 "Don't Wanna" (Hans Teuber) 
 "Song for Bad" (Hans Teuber)
 "Taming the Shrew" (Steve Moore)
 "Irritaint" (Hans Teuber)
 "Summer Pudding" (Hans Teuber)
 "Daddy Won't Taint Bye-Bye" (Steve Moore)

References 

2006 albums
Skerik's Syncopated Taint Septet albums
Hyena Records albums